Kollam or Quilon is a thickly populated city in Kerala, India. It is home to a population of more than 3.5 Lakh (350,000) people. Kollam is a microcosm of Kerala and its residents belong to varied religious, ethnic and linguistic groups. A good number of Anglo-Indians, Gujaratis, Kutchi Memon & Tamilians are residing in Kollam city. The city is having a density of 6199/km2, which is second highest in Kerala. Kollam Metropolitan Area is having a population of 11.10 Lakh. In terms of economic performance and per capita income, Kollam city is in 5th position among the Indian cities and 3rd in Kerala behind Kochi and Kannur.

North Kollam

Kannimel
Kavanad
Kureepuzha
Maruthadi
Meenathucheri
Neendakara
Punnathala
Ramankulangara
Sakthikulangara
Thirumullavaram
Vallikeezhu
Vattakayal

Central Kollam

Andamukkam
Asramam
Chamakada
Chinnakada
Cutchery
Kadappakada
Kaikulangara
Karbala
Kochupilamoodu
Cantonment
Mathilil
Mulamkadakam
Pattathanam
Polayathode
Punnathanam
Thevally
Thoppilkadavu
Udayamarthandapuram
Uliyakovil
Vadakkumbhagam

West Kollam

Jonakapuram
Kallupalam
Kaval
Mulakkada
Paikkada
Pallithottam
Port Kollam
Tangasseri
Thamarakulam
Vady

East Kollam

Arunoottimangalam
Ayathil
Chandanathoppe
Chathinamkulam
Kallumthazham
Karikkodu
Kilikollur
Koikkal
Manakkadu
Mangadu
Mulluvila
Palakkadavu
Palathara
Palkulangara
Pullikada
Punthalathazham

South Kollam

Akkolil
Eravipuram
Kayyalakkal
Kollurvila
Koottikkada
Madannada
Mevaram
Pallimukku
Thattamala
Thekkevila
Thekkumbhagam
Vadakkevila
Valathungal

Footnotes

Kollam
N
Government of Kollam